The 10th constituency of Bouches-du-Rhône is a French legislative constituency in Bouches-du-Rhône.

Deputies

Elections

2022

 
 
 
 
 
 
 
 
|-
| colspan="8" bgcolor="#E9E9E9"|
|-

2017

2012

|- style="background-color:#E9E9E9;text-align:center;"
! colspan="2" rowspan="2" style="text-align:left;" | Candidate
! rowspan="2" colspan="2" style="text-align:left;" | Party
! colspan="2" | 1st round
! colspan="2" | 2nd round
|- style="background-color:#E9E9E9;text-align:center;"
! width="75" | Votes
! width="30" | %
! width="75" | Votes
! width="30" | %
|-
| style="background-color:" |
| style="text-align:left;" | François-Michel Lambert
| style="text-align:left;" | Europe Ecology – The Greens
| EELV
| 
| 29.02%
| 
| 41.64%
|-
| style="background-color:" |
| style="text-align:left;" | Richard Mallie
| style="text-align:left;" | Union for a Popular Movement
| UMP
| 
| 31.45%
| 
| 38.13%
|-
| style="background-color:" |
| style="text-align:left;" | Pascale-Edith Guennec
| style="text-align:left;" | Front National
| FN
| 
| 22.59%
| 
| 20.23%
|-
| style="background-color:" |
| style="text-align:left;" | Yveline Primo
| style="text-align:left;" | Left Front
| FG
| 
| 11.18%
| colspan="2" style="text-align:left;" |
|-
| style="background-color:" |
| style="text-align:left;" | Patrice Daude
| style="text-align:left;" | Ecologist
| ECO
| 
| 1.68%
| colspan="2" style="text-align:left;" |
|-
| style="background-color:" |
| style="text-align:left;" | Nathalie Minari
| style="text-align:left;" | 
| CEN
| 
| 1.41%
| colspan="2" style="text-align:left;" |
|-
| style="background-color:" |
| style="text-align:left;" | Chantal Cruveiller Giacalone
| style="text-align:left;" | Miscellaneous Right
| DVD
| 
| 1.13%
| colspan="2" style="text-align:left;" |
|-
| style="background-color:" |
| style="text-align:left;" | Nancy Ithamar
| style="text-align:left;" | Miscellaneous Right
| DVD
| 
| 0.62%
| colspan="2" style="text-align:left;" |
|-
| style="background-color:" |
| style="text-align:left;" | Roseline Guez
| style="text-align:left;" | Far Right
| EXD
| 
| 0.61%
| colspan="2" style="text-align:left;" |
|-
| style="background-color:" |
| style="text-align:left;" | Christian Lecat
| style="text-align:left;" | Far Left
| EXG
| 
| 0.31%
| colspan="2" style="text-align:left;" |
|-
| colspan="8" style="background-color:#E9E9E9;"|
|- style="font-weight:bold"
| colspan="4" style="text-align:left;" | Total
| 
| 100%
| 
| 100%
|-
| colspan="8" style="background-color:#E9E9E9;"|
|-
| colspan="4" style="text-align:left;" | Registered voters
| 
| style="background-color:#E9E9E9;"|
| 
| style="background-color:#E9E9E9;"|
|-
| colspan="4" style="text-align:left;" | Blank/Void ballots
| 
| 1.31%
| 
| 1.60%
|-
| colspan="4" style="text-align:left;" | Turnout
| 
| 60.07%
| 
| 60.10%
|-
| colspan="4" style="text-align:left;" | Abstentions
| 
| 39.93%
| 
| 39.90%
|-
| colspan="8" style="background-color:#E9E9E9;"|
|- style="font-weight:bold"
| colspan="6" style="text-align:left;" | Result
| colspan="2" style="background-color:" | EELV GAIN FROM UMP
|}

2007

|- style="background-color:#E9E9E9;text-align:center;"
! colspan="2" rowspan="2" style="text-align:left;" | Candidate
! rowspan="2" colspan="2" style="text-align:left;" | Party
! colspan="2" | 1st round
! colspan="2" | 2nd round
|- style="background-color:#E9E9E9;text-align:center;"
! width="75" | Votes
! width="30" | %
! width="75" | Votes
! width="30" | %
|-
| style="background-color:" |
| style="text-align:left;" | Richard Mallie
| style="text-align:left;" | Union for a Popular Movement
| UMP
| 
| 46.55%
| 
| 57.12%
|-
| style="background-color:" |
| style="text-align:left;" | Roger Mei
| style="text-align:left;" | Communist
| PCF
| 
| 17.90%
| 
| 42.88%
|-
| style="background-color:" |
| style="text-align:left;" | Roland Povinelli
| style="text-align:left;" | Socialist Party
| PS
| 
| 17.28%
| colspan="2" style="text-align:left;" |
|-
| style="background-color:" |
| style="text-align:left;" | Catherine Bisserier
| style="text-align:left;" | Front National
| FN
| 
| 5.95%
| colspan="2" style="text-align:left;" |
|-
| style="background-color:" |
| style="text-align:left;" | Marc Russeil
| style="text-align:left;" | Democratic Movement
| MoDem
| 
| 5.88%
| colspan="2" style="text-align:left;" |
|-
| style="background-color:" |
| style="text-align:left;" | Patrice Daude
| style="text-align:left;" | Ecologist
| ECO
| 
| 1.96%
| colspan="2" style="text-align:left;" |
|-
| style="background-color:" |
| style="text-align:left;" | Jérôme Freydier
| style="text-align:left;" | Far Left
| EXG
| 
| 1.72%
| colspan="2" style="text-align:left;" |
|-
| style="background-color:" |
| style="text-align:left;" | Lucien Morini
| style="text-align:left;" | Hunting, Fishing, Nature, Traditions
| CPNT
| 
| 1.11%
| colspan="2" style="text-align:left;" |
|-
| style="background-color:" |
| style="text-align:left;" | Lyonel Joubeaux
| style="text-align:left;" | Far Right
| EXD
| 
| 0.68%
| colspan="2" style="text-align:left;" |
|-
| style="background-color:" |
| style="text-align:left;" | Alain Sembely
| style="text-align:left;" | Independent
| DIV
| 
| 0.59%
| colspan="2" style="text-align:left;" |
|-
| style="background-color:" |
| style="text-align:left;" | Claudine Rodinson
| style="text-align:left;" | Far Left
| EXG
| 
| 0.38%
| colspan="2" style="text-align:left;" |
|-
| style="background-color:" |
| style="text-align:left;" | Bruno Musmeaux
| style="text-align:left;" | Independent
| DIV
| 
| 0.00%
| colspan="2" style="text-align:left;" |
|-
| style="background-color:" |
| style="text-align:left;" | Simon Imbert Vier
| style="text-align:left;" | Miscellaneous Left
| DVG
| 
| 0.00%
| colspan="2" style="text-align:left;" |
|-
| style="background-color:" |
| style="text-align:left;" | Yann Paqueron
| style="text-align:left;" | Miscellaneous Right
| DVD
| 
| 0.00%
| colspan="2" style="text-align:left;" |
|-
| colspan="8" style="background-color:#E9E9E9;"|
|- style="font-weight:bold"
| colspan="4" style="text-align:left;" | Total
| 
| 100%
| 
| 100%
|-
| colspan="8" style="background-color:#E9E9E9;"|
|-
| colspan="4" style="text-align:left;" | Registered voters
| 
| style="background-color:#E9E9E9;"|
| 
| style="background-color:#E9E9E9;"|
|-
| colspan="4" style="text-align:left;" | Blank/Void ballots
| 
| 1.21%
| 
| 3.01%
|-
| colspan="4" style="text-align:left;" | Turnout
| 
| 60.19%
| 
| 58.10%
|-
| colspan="4" style="text-align:left;" | Abstentions
| 
| 39.81%
| 
| 41.90%
|-
| colspan="8" style="background-color:#E9E9E9;"|
|- style="font-weight:bold"
| colspan="6" style="text-align:left;" | Result
| colspan="2" style="background-color:" | UMP HOLD
|}

2002

 
 
 
 
 
 
 
|-
| colspan="8" bgcolor="#E9E9E9"|
|-

1997

 
 
 
 
 
 
|-
| colspan="8" bgcolor="#E9E9E9"|
|-

References

10